The TVR 350SE was a sports car designed and built by TVR starting in 1990 and ending in 1991.  
In 1990 TVR Engineering Limited produced a limited production run of 25 specially prepared 350's to mark the end of the era heralded by the 350i. This commemorated the previous 7 years of production during which time over a thousand 350i-model TVRs were manufactured.
The limited production 350SE was seen as the ultimate progression of the 350i in terms of both outright performance and enjoyment.

All 350SEs featured a 3.9 litre NCK hotwire Rover V8 all-alloy engine, polished multi-spoke alloy wheels and Koni adjustable shock absorbers.

Individual cars
Each car is uniquely numbered with its number surrounded in laurels in gold for future recognition on the side wings and rear. The cars also had 350SE decals on front spoiler, side sills and rear. TVR originally sold the 350SEs for £21,000.

Number 13 was never made so there was a number 26 to make up the 25 cars. Number 20 was a big valve. Number 19 has been broken up for parts and no longer exists.

Number 1 of 25 is Monza red with a cream and red interior and shown in the top photograph.

References

350SE
Sports cars

Cars introduced in 1990